Navarretia atractyloides is a species of flowering plant in the phlox family known by the common name hollyleaf pincushionplant.

It is native to the coastal mountain ranges of western North America from Oregon through California to Baja California, where it grows in open areas in local habitat types. It is similar to Navarretia hamata, but lacks the skunky scent of that species.

It is a hairy, glandular annual herb approaching 30 centimeters in maximum height. The leaves are strap-shaped with abrupt divisions into small, narrow teeth at intervals. The inflorescence is a head filled with spine-toothed, leaflike bracts. The flowers tucked amidst the bracts are light purple or occasionally white, with reddish veining in their tubular throats. The flower is just under a centimeter long and has a five-lobed corolla.

External links
Calflora Database: Navarretia atractyloides (holly leaf navarretia,  hollyleaf pincushionplant)
 Jepson Manual eFlora (TJM2) treatment of Navarretia atractyloides
UC Photos gallery — Navarretia atractyloides

atractyloides
Flora of California
Flora of Baja California
Flora of Oregon
Flora of the Cascade Range
Flora of the Sierra Nevada (United States)
Natural history of the California chaparral and woodlands
Natural history of the California Coast Ranges
Natural history of the Channel Islands of California
Natural history of the Peninsular Ranges
Natural history of the Transverse Ranges
Flora without expected TNC conservation status